The Little Kern River is a  major tributary of the upper Kern River in the Sequoia National Forest, in the southern Sierra Nevada, California. It is one of three streams, along with Volcano Creek and Golden Trout Creek, that harbor beautiful golden trout (Oncorhynchus mykiss aguabonita).

Watershed and Course

The Little Kern begins at Bullfrog Lakes, in the Golden Trout Wilderness south of Farewell Gap near Mineral King. It flows south, past Table Meadow and Burnt Corral Meadows, then enters a deep gorge before it joins with the Kern River at Forks of the Kern. The Little Kern roughly defines the southwest boundary of the Great Western Divide; the confluence with the main Kern (which flows to the east of the range) marks the southernmost tip of the range.

Ecology
Major efforts were made since the 1960s to create refuge areas for golden trout in the upper reaches of the South Fork Kern River. Three barriers were built (Ramshaw, Templeton, and Schaeffer) and a piscicide was applied to the river to kill all non-native fish above or between these barriers. From 1969 through 2000, 10 chemical treatments were performed, with varying degrees of success.

References

Rivers of Tulare County, California